The Hose's pygmy flying squirrel (Petaurillus hosei) is a species of rodent in the family Sciuridae.  It was named for zoologist Charles Hose. It is endemic to Malaysia.

References

Endemic fauna of Malaysia
Rodents of Malaysia
Petaurillus
Mammals described in 1900
Taxa named by Oldfield Thomas
Taxonomy articles created by Polbot